Delphine Serina (6 May 1970 – 19 April 2020) was a French actress.

Biography
Born in Paris, Serina's father was from Sicily, and her mother was from Auvergne. She spent her childhood in Montmartre and studied at the National School Of Arts And Techniques Du Théatre. Serina often performed with Alain Delon, Claudia Cardinale, and Francis Huster. She trained for a year at La Fémis, creating a script and starring herself as the heroine.

Delphine Serina died on 19 April 2020 at the age of 49 in Paris following a long illness.

Filmography
The Liars (1996)
On Guard (1997)
Heureuse (2001)
Tanguy (2001)
Judas (2006)
Chrysalide (2012)
Monsieur je-sais-tout (2018)

References

External links

Actresses from Paris
1970 births
2020 deaths
French people of Sicilian descent
People of Montmartre